Filipe Oliveira may refer to:

Filipe Oliveira (footballer, born 1984), Portuguese footballer
Filipe Oliveira (footballer, born 1994), Portuguese footballer
Filipe Oliveira (footballer, born 1995), East Timorese footballer